Paliga ignealis is a moth of the family Crambidae. It was described by Francis Walker in 1866 and it is found in New Guinea and Queensland, Australia.

Adults have orange wings with brown lines.

References

Moths described in 1866
Pyraustinae